Spatalistis bifasciana is a species of moth of the family Tortricidae. It is found in most of Europe.

The wingspan is 12–17 mm. The wings are marked dark brown with yellowish in the terminal area and metallic blue-grey streaks. Adults are on wing from May to July.

The larvae have been recorded feeding internally in the berries or fruits of Vaccinium myrtillus, Vaccinium uliginosum, Rhamnus catharcticus, Cornus mas and Ligustrum vulgare. However, recent research recorded the larvae amongst dead Quercus and Castanea sativa leaves.

References

Moths described in 1787
bifasciana
Moths of Europe
Taxa named by Jacob Hübner